"A Woman, a Lover, a Friend" is the 1960 follow up single to "Doggin' Around" performed by Jackie Wilson.  Just as its predecessor, the single made it to number one on the R&B charts, where it stayed at the top spot for one month.  "A Woman, a Lover, a Friend", also charted on the Hot 100 peaking at number fifteen.

Other versions
 The song was first time released by Buddy Johnson & His Orchestra in September 1959 as the B-side of the single "Keeping My Love for You".
An instrumental version appeared on the Booker T. & the M.G.'s album Green Onions in 1962.
Otis Redding covered this song in 1964.

References

1960 singles
Jackie Wilson songs
1960 songs
Song articles with missing songwriters
Songs written by Sid Wyche